Let's Kill Uncle—also known as Let's Kill Uncle Before Uncle Kills Us—is a 1966 color black comedy film produced and directed by William Castle, about a young boy trapped on an island by his uncle, who is planning to kill him. The boy's only friend is a young girl, who tries to help him. It stars Nigel Green, Mary Badham, Pat Cardi and Robert Pickering and is based on a 1963 novel written by Rohan O'Grady, the pen name of Canadian authoress June Margaret O'Grady Skinner. It was filmed in Universal Studios on the largest sound stage, taking advantage of the process screen, with a location shot of a beach in Malibu, California.

Plot
Following the death of multi-millionaire Russell Harrison in a car crash, his $5 million estate falls to his only child, 12 year old Barnaby Harrison, who will receive the money when reaching his age of majority. In the meantime, Barnaby will live with his uncle, Major Kevin Harrison, who resides on a remote, sparsely populated island eight miles from the mainland. During World War II, Kevin was a James Bond type British Army Intelligence Commando and has published an account of his war exploits entitled Killing the Enemy, detailing his multiple accounts of extreme close combat killing of various Germans.

Barnaby is escorted by Police Detective Sergeant Frank Travis on a cruise to the island. Aboard the boat is Chrissie, who is Barnaby's age. The two children constantly argue, with Chrissie believing Barnaby is telling fantastic lies about his uncle's exploits, though Frank does reveal himself as a policeman to her. Chrissie has come from a broken home and will be living with her Aunt Justine, who lives on Uncle Kevin's island.

Barnaby's bad behavior continues on the island, with Frank chastising him for playing with his detective revolver, Barnaby leading Christine astray by visiting a dangerous decrepit hotel and Barnaby keeping up a constant litany of tall tales to impress or frighten Chrissie. Barnaby, however, worships his heroic Uncle Kevin and enjoys reading his book. One night, Uncle Kevin, dressed in his wartime military beret and battledress (as he does on the cover of his book), visits a sleeping Barnaby and wakes him to go on an adventure with him. Leading Barnaby to high cliffs overlooking the crashing surf, Uncle Kevin hypnotizes Barnaby to walk in specific directions with the aim of having Barnaby fall off the cliff to his death, whilst Kevin is home in his bed. The next day, Justine sees Barnaby perilously close to the edge of a high cliff and shouts at him, waking him out of his trance.

A shaken Barnaby believes that he was walking in his sleep until Uncle Kevin later jovially explains that he intends to kill Barnaby for his inheritance. Though his first attempt at eliminating him in a manner appearing accidental failed, he vows to try again. Kevin also explains that his home is "Switzerland", an area of neutrality where he will not harm Barnaby, and adds that he will also not harm Barnaby when he is with Justine or Sgt. Travis, the latter of whom still remains on the island as Uncle Kevin's guest.

Based on Barnaby's previous lies and hysterical behavior, no one believes him, until Chrissie discovers the truth and gleefully suggests they kill Uncle Kevin first. The trio begin a series of cat and mouse assassination attempts against each other. When Uncle Kevin discovers that Chrissie stole Sgt Travis's revolver and came up with an unsuccessful assassination attempt, Kevin includes her in his game.

Production
The film was William Castle's third and final film for Universal Pictures, with Castle purchasing the film rights for the novel soon after its 1963 publication. Universal's casting director, John Badham, cast his younger sister Mary, who had gained acclaim in the role of Scout in To Kill a Mockingbird (1962). He also chose Pat Cardi, who had recently appeared in Universal's And Now Miguel (1966); Badham and Castle picked Cardi over both Stanley Livingston—then co-starring on My Three Sons—as well as James Mason's son. Nigel Green had recently co-starred in Universal's The Ipcress File (1965) and Let's Kill Uncle was Green's first lead role. Nestor Paiva was suffering from stomach cancer during the production and died the year the film was released.

During filming, Castle had wanted Barnaby to inherit $20 million, although the total had been $10 million in the novel. Universal insisted on $5 million and when Castle objected, MCA Universal head Lew Wasserman came to see Castle himself, telling him, "For $20 million, I'd kill the kid myself".

Cardi recalled that Nigel Green acted as a real life friendly uncle to him on the set, giving him tips on performing. Cardi admitted that the tarantulas frightened him, so during rehearsals plastic spiders were used, even though both the spider wrangler and Castle told him the real spider had been defanged and was harmless. When shooting the actual scenes, the real tarantula was present, with Castle asking Cardi, "wouldn't it be fun to drop it on Nigel's chest?" Green was unenthusiastic until Castle told him that Sean Connery had a real tarantula walk on his chest in Dr. No (1962). Green shouted, "If it's good enough for Connery, it's good enough for me!", and did the scene without complaint, unaware that Connery actually had a tarantula walk over a glass pane rather than on his naked skin.

Cardi stated that several endings were shot for the film and "Universal picked the worst one", adding that there "were a lot of politics going on with the film".

Cast
Nigel Green as The Uncle - Major Kevin Harrison
Mary Badham as Chrissie
Pat Cardi as Barnaby Harrison
Robert Pickering as Sgt. Frank Travis
Linda Lawson as Justine
Ref Sanchez as Ketchman
Nestor Paiva as Steward
William Castle as Russell Harrison

Release
The film was censored in the UK to obtain an A rating. No information is available from the BBFC on what was removed.

Home media
In June 2020, a restored version of the film was released on Blu-ray by Kino Lorber.

Reception
Howard Thompson  of The New York Times was unreceptive to the film, writing, "Say this for Let's Kill Uncle. It's the least bad chiller ever made by William Castle [...] [who's] paced the film like molasses."

In popular culture
English singer-songwriter Morrissey referenced this film in the title of his 1991 album Kill Uncle.

See also
List of American films of 1966

References

External links

 
 

1966 films
1960s thriller films
American comedy films
American thriller films
American black comedy films
Censored films
American comedy thriller films
Films based on American novels
Films directed by William Castle
Films scored by Herman Stein
Films set on islands
Universal Pictures films
1960s English-language films
1960s American films